Namma Ooru Hero is a 2019 Tamil reality talk show which is currently telecasted on Sun TV at 9:30 PM on every Sunday which started airing from 20 January 2019 and 12 May 2019. The TV programme is presented by popular actor Vijay Sethupathi who eventually made his full-fledged television debut as a host.

The title of the show itself reveals about the many unknown or lesser known unsung heroes in the society who selflessly toil for the betterment of the society and content of the show is reported to have not included any other famous celebrities including actors and politicians except the presenter of the show.

The announcement about the launch of the programme was revealed by Sun TV during November 2018  and it eventually replaced Sun Naam Oruvar which was hosted by actor Vishal.

List of episodes

References

External links

Sun TV original programming
Tamil-language talk shows
Tamil-language television shows
2010s Tamil-language television series
2019 Tamil-language television series debuts
2019 Tamil-language television series endings